Racquel Sheath (born 27 November 1994) is a retired New Zealand track and road cyclist. She represented her nation at the 2015 UCI Track Cycling World Championships.

Sheath competed for the New Zealand team in the women's team pursuit at the 2016 Summer Olympics in Rio de Janeiro. There, she delivered the quartet of Lauren Ellis, Jaime Nielsen, and Rushlee Buchanan a New Zealand record of 4:17.592 to ensure the team's spot in the medal race, before narrowly losing the face-off to their Canadian rivals (4:18.459) for the bronze by a 3.8-second margin.

Sheath retired from cycling in August 2020. Following her retirement, she became a financial adviser with her family's insurance company, and opened a nail salon in Cambridge.

Major results

2014
 Oceania Track Championships
1st  Team pursuit (with Lauren Ellis, Jaime Nielsen and Georgia Williams)
2nd  Omnium
 BikeNZ Classic
3rd Points race
3rd Scratch
2015
 6th Overall Tour of America's Dairyland
2016
 1st  Criterium, National Road Championships
 Oceania Track Championships
2nd  Madison (with Michaela Drummond)
2nd  Omnium
2nd  Team sprint (with Emma Cumming)
3rd  Points race
2017
 Oceania Track Championships
1st  Omnium
1st  Team pursuit
 2nd Omnium, National Track Championships
 2nd Criterium, National Road Championships
 3rd  Team pursuit, UCI Track Cycling World Championships
 6th White Spot / Delta Road Race
2018
 1st  Criterium, National Road Championships
 2nd  Team pursuit, Commonwealth Games

References

External links
 
 
 
 
 
 

1994 births
Living people
New Zealand female cyclists
Olympic cyclists of New Zealand
Cyclists at the 2016 Summer Olympics
Commonwealth Games medallists in cycling
Commonwealth Games silver medallists for New Zealand
Cyclists at the 2018 Commonwealth Games
Financial advisors
Medallists at the 2018 Commonwealth Games